Zhaosi Hall is a cultural site protected at the national level in Wuxi, People's Republic of China.

History
Zhaosi Hall was built by the father of Consort Duan, a Ming dynasty concubine of the Jiajing Emperor. The building was completed in 1528 and today lies in front of the home of the Cao family of Shuofang district. In 1748, descendants of the Cao family designated the building as an ancestral shrine.

Zhaosi Hall was designated a Cultural Site Protected at the Provincial Level in 1995.

Architecture
Zhaosi Hall is typical of a Ming dynasty Jiangsu style courtyard house. The central hall is five rooms across, with a hill-shaped roof. The entire building is made from a very expensive and rare type of local cedar wood.

Consort Duan's burial
In 2013, archaeologists observed that a stone archway near to Zhaosi Hall was built in the style of an imperial memorial, but lacked an inscription. Local people reported that there had been a grave tumulus near the arch that had been levelled, suggesting that the individual buried there was the recipient of an imperial, uninscribed memorial. Additionally, the word cedar in the original name Xiangnan ting sounds similar to the word for daughter in the local dialect. Consequently, the archway is popularly believed to have been erected by Cao Ji in memory of his daughter.

References

Buildings and structures in Wuxi
Ming dynasty architecture
Traditional folk houses in Jiangsu
Major National Historical and Cultural Sites in Jiangsu